Gregory Brian Williams (born 1969) is an American lawyer from Delaware who serves as a United States district judge of United States District Court for the District of Delaware.

Education 

Williams received both a Bachelor of Arts and Bachelor of Science from Millersville University of Pennsylvania in 1990 and a Juris Doctor from Villanova University School of Law in 1995.

Career 

Williams served in the United States Army Reserve from 1986 to 1992. He joined the Wilmington, Delaware, office of Fox Rothschild LLP in 1995 as an associate and was elevated to partner in 2003, where he specialized in commercial law and patent law. He has served as a special master in complex civil cases for the District of Delaware since 2020.

Federal judicial service 
On April 13, 2022, President Joe Biden announced his intent to nominate Williams to serve as a United States district judge of the United States District Court for the District of Delaware. On April 25, 2022, his nomination was sent to the Senate. President Biden nominated Williams to the seat vacated by Judge Leonard P. Stark, who was elevated to the Federal Circuit Court on March 17, 2022. On May 11, 2022, a hearing on his nomination was held before the Senate Judiciary Committee. On June 9, 2022, his nomination was reported out of the committee by an 11–9–2 vote, with Senators Patrick Leahy and Thom Tillis passed on the vote. On July 20, 2022, the United States Senate invoked cloture on his nomination by a 52–43 vote. His nomination was confirmed later that day by a 52–43 vote. He received his judicial commission on September 1, 2022. Williams became the only judge of color currently serving on the U.S. District Court for the District of Delaware, and the second African American judge to ever serve on the District of Delaware, with Gregory Moneta Sleet being the first.

See also 
 List of African-American federal judges
 List of African-American jurists

References

External links 

1969 births
Living people
20th-century American lawyers
21st-century American judges
African-American judges
21st-century American lawyers
African-American lawyers
Delaware lawyers
Judges of the United States District Court for the District of Delaware
Millersville University of Pennsylvania alumni
People from Chester, Pennsylvania
United States Army reservists
United States district court judges appointed by Joe Biden
Villanova University School of Law alumni